King's Lynn and West Norfolk is a local government district with borough status in Norfolk, England.  Its council is based in the town of King's Lynn. The population of the Local Authority at the 2011 Census was 147,451.

History
The district was formed in 1974 by the merger of the Municipal Borough of King's Lynn, Hunstanton and Downham Market urban districts along with Docking Rural District, Downham Rural District, Freebridge Lynn Rural District and Marshland Rural District.  The district was originally known as just West Norfolk, and adopted its present name in 1981.

Politics

Elections to the borough council are held every four years, with all of the 55 councillors, representing 42 wards, on the council being elected at each election. After being under no overall control from the 1999 election, the Conservative party gained a majority at the 2003 election and has held one ever since, although losing a large number of seats due to the resurgence of the Independent Group in 2019. This meant that at the election the Tories were cut back to 28 seats, and opposition parties 27.

Following the United Kingdom local elections, 2019 the political composition of King's Lynn and West Norfolk council was as follows:

UK Youth Parliament

Although the UK Youth Parliament is an apolitical organisation, the elections are run in a way similar to that of the Local Elections. The votes come from 11 to 18 year olds and are combined to make the decision of the next, 2 year Member of Youth Parliament. The elections are run at different times across the country with King's Lynn and West Norfolk's typically being in early Spring and bi-annually.

Composition
The district comprises the urban area of King's Lynn itself, together with 102 surrounding parishes. At the time of the 2001 census, the district had an area of 1,473 km², of which 28 km² was in the urban area and 1,445 km² in the surrounding parishes. The district had a population of 135,345 in 58,338 households, with 34,564 in 15,285 households living in the urban area, whilst 100,781 people in 43,053 households lived in the surrounding parishes.

The urban area of King's Lynn itself is unparished. The remainder of the district lies within the following civil parishes:

Arms

References
Official Website
West Norfolk Information

 
Non-metropolitan districts of Norfolk
Boroughs in England